Michaela Šojdrová (born 28 October 1963) is a Czech politician who has been serving as Member of the European Parliament (MEP) since July 2014. She is a member of the Christian and Democratic Union – Czechoslovak People's Party, part of the European People's Party.

Career
Prior to entering politics Šojdrová worked at the head office of the Czech School Inspection. She was also employed in various other education administrative roles.

Šojdrová has been a Member of the European Parliament since the 2014 elections. She has since been serving on the Committee on Culture and Education, where she is the EPP group’s coordinator. From 2014 until 2019, she was also a member of the Committee on Women's Rights and Gender Equality. Since her election, her work has focused on women's rights and gender equality.

In addition to her committee assignments, Šojdrová is part of the Parliament's delegations to the EU-Armenia Parliamentary Partnership Committee, the EU-Azerbaijan Parliamentary Cooperation Committee and the EU-Georgia Parliamentary Association Committee as well as to the Euronest Parliamentary Assembly. She is also part of the European Parliament Intergroup on Disability.

Parliamentary service
Vice-chair, Committee on Culture and Education (2014-2017)
Member, Committee on Culture and Education (2014-)
Member, Committee on Women's Rights and Gender Equality (2014-)
Member, Delegation to the EU-Turkey Joint Parliamentary Committee (2014-)

References

Living people
1963 births
KDU-ČSL MEPs
Czech feminists
Women MEPs for the Czech Republic
MEPs for the Czech Republic 2014–2019
Politicians from Zlín
MEPs for the Czech Republic 2019–2024
Mendel University Brno alumni